Cultural Heritage Class  is the designation given by the Provincial Parks System of Ontario, Canada, for parks which emphasise the protection of historical and cultural resources, in an outdoor setting.

See also 
List of Ontario parks

References